The common brown water snake (Lycodonomorphus rufulus) is a species of nonvenomous, South African, snake.

This gentle, harmless snake is by far the most common water snake in southern Africa. It can be found from Cape Town in the south, along the wet east coast of South Africa and inland as far as Gauteng, Lesotho, and Zimbabwe. Throughout its range, its natural habitat is water margins, where it shelters under leaves and logs. It emerges at night to hunt frogs and sometimes rodents. It lays up to 10 eggs at the end of summer.

References

 Scale count of Lycodonomorphus members
 
 Broadley, D.G. (1967). A review of the genus Lycodonomorphus Fitzinger (Serpentes: Colubridae) in southeastern Africa, with a key to the genus. Arnoldia 3 (16): 1-9
 Haagner, G.V. 1992. Life History Notes - Lycodonomorphus rufulus Jour. Herp. Ass. Afr. (41): 42-42
 Lichtenstein, M. HINRICH C. 1823. Verzeichniss der Doubletten des zoologischen Museums der Königl. Universität zu Berlin nebst Beschreibung vieler bisher unbekannter Arten von Säugethieren, Vögeln, Amphibien und Fischen. Königl. Preuss. Akad. Wiss./ T. Trautwein, Berlin. x, 118 pages
 Marais, J. 2004. A Complete Guide to the Snakes of Southern Africa, 2nd ed. Struik Publishers, 312 pp.

Colubrids
Snakes of Africa
Reptiles of South Africa
Natural history of Cape Town
Reptiles described in 1823
Taxa named by Hinrich Lichtenstein